The Royal Hong Kong Auxiliary Air Force (RHKAAF) was a Hong Kong Government department based in Hong Kong. It was formed as an air force in 1949 as part of the Hong Kong Defence Force. In preparation for the transfer of sovereignty from the United Kingdom to the People's Republic of China, the unit was disbanded on 31 March 1993.

History
The history of the unit goes way back to the early days of Hong Kong as a British colony. On 30 May 1854, with the departure from Hong Kong of the British men-of-war on anti-piracy duties in the north, following the Shanghai precedent, an appeal was made by the Lieutenant-Governor, Sir William Caine, for willing citizens to assemble for the purpose of forming an auxiliary police force to protect the lives and property of Hong Kong’s inhabitants. Ninety-nine worthy men turned up and the Hong Kong Volunteer Corps was formed. Following numerous incarnations, the Royal Hong Kong Regiment (The Volunteers) and the Royal Hong Kong Auxiliary Air Force were spawned from this original corps of volunteers.

The HKAAF came into existence as an air force in 1949 as part of the Hong Kong Defence Force. From 1949 to 1970, it was known as the Hong Kong Auxiliary Air Force (HKAAF). Its royal title was approved by King George VI in 1st May 1951, as was that of what became the Royal Hong Kong Defence Force (RHKDF). This was the first time that a volunteer force had been so honoured.

When the Royal Hong Kong Defence Force was disbanded in 1970, the Royal Hong Kong Auxiliary Air Force (RHKAAF) and Royal Hong Kong Regiment (RHKR) were formed under new ordinances as separate units. The RHKAAF was finally disbanded on 31 March 1993, and succeeded the following day by the Hong Kong Government Flying Service (GFS), a newly created civilian unit using the original service staff of the RHKAAF.

Although technically an armed military unit, run on the lines of an RAF squadron, latterly the unit's responsibilities were mostly involved in providing non-military aviation services such as police support, search and rescue, flying doctor, air ambulance and firefighting in the colony.

The RHKAAF was based at Kai Tak Airport from 1949 to 1993.

Badge
The last badge of the force was used until 1993, after which time, the Hong Kong Coat of Arms was used on GFS aircraft, until the handover in 1997:

 St Edward's Crown
 Octagon-shaped badge with a Hong Kong dragon, propeller
 Royal Hong Kong Auxiliary Air Force is contained on the band of the badge
 Motto contain the wording Semper Paratus (Latin, "Always Ready")
 Oak Laurel wreath

Personnel
RHKAAF personnel were a mixture of full-time and part-time staff. Most were locally recruited, in the latter years mostly local Hong Kongers. The ranks used were the same as those of the Royal Air Force, up to Air Commodore.

Commanding officers

Fleet
On 31 March 1993, the RHKAAF fleet comprised:

Aircraft

Historical aircraft

References

Further reading
 Penlington VA: Winged Dragon - The History of the Royal Hong Kong Auxiliary Air Force (Odyssey Productions Ltd, 1996)

External links

 RHKAAF - dedicated to the people who served in the RHKAAF
 World Air Forces  – Historical Listings – Hong Kong (HKG)
 GFS
 Hong Kong Defense Forces – 1991
 RHKAAF
 Aerospace History in HK

1949 establishments in Hong Kong
1993 disestablishments in Hong Kong
Auxiliary Air Force, Royal Hong Kong
Auxiliary Air Force, Royal Hong Kong
Military units and formations established in 1949
Military units and formations disestablished in 1993
Hong Kong
Organisations based in Hong Kong with royal patronage
20th-century history of the Royal Air Force
Reserve air forces